Saïd Mohamed Ben Chech Abdallah Cheikh (1 July 1904 – 16 March 1970) was the head of the Government of Comoros from 1962 until his death in 1970. Cheikh served in the French National Assembly from 1946 until 1962 and was also the president of the Parti Vert.

Biography
Cheikh was born on 7 April 1904 in Mitsamiouli on Grande Comore. He completed his education in Madagascar qualifying in 1926 in medicine. When he returned to the Comoros islands he was the first doctor. He worked as a doctor until the end of the second world war in 1945.

In 1954, he was the French diplomatic representative at the United Nations General Assembly. Dr. Said Mohamed Cheikh was considered to be, in the period leading up to independence, the most important political leader in the islands.

Cheikh was elected as the first president of the Governing Council of the Comoros Chamber of Deputies in 1961, a post he held until he died of a heart attack in 1970 in Antananarivo in Madagascar. Cheikh was buried in Moroni in the Comoros.

Honours
Postage stamps bearing his likeness were issued in 1973. In 1978, the government issued high value gold coins worth 10,000 and 20,000 francs which bore the likeness of Cheikh.
Since 2006, he also appears on the 5000 Comoran franc banknote.

References
 page on the French National Assembly website

1904 births
1970 deaths
People from Grande Comore
Democratic and Socialist Union of the Resistance politicians
Members of the Constituent Assembly of France (1945)
Members of the Constituent Assembly of France (1946)
Deputies of the 1st National Assembly of the French Fourth Republic
Deputies of the 2nd National Assembly of the French Fourth Republic
Deputies of the 3rd National Assembly of the French Fourth Republic
Deputies of the 1st National Assembly of the French Fifth Republic
Comorian politicians
Prime Ministers of the Comoros